Kahriz-e Sorkh (also Romanized as Kahrīz-e Sorkh and Kahrīz Sorkh) is a village in Borborud-e Gharbi Rural District, in the Central District of Aligudarz County, Lorestan Province, Iran. At the 2006 census, its population was 161, in 30 families.

References 

Towns and villages in Aligudarz County